The Development Bank of Namibia (DBN) is a state owned development bank in Namibia.

Overview
The bank began its operations in 2004. The main objective of DBN is to promote and finance development in those sectors of the economy which support development and the welfare of the citizens of the country. , the total asset valuation of the bank was in excess of US$146 million (NAD:1.602 billion), with shareholders equity of approximately US$144.3 million (NAD:1.583 billion)

Board of directors
, the following individuals constituted the board of directors of the Development Bank OF Namibia:

 Tania Hangula: Chairperson
 Tabitha Mbome
 Muetulamba Shingenge-Haipinge
 Emma Haiyambo
 Albie Basson
 Justus Hausiku
 Martin Inkumbi: Chief Executive Officer

See also
 List of banks in Namibia
 Economy of Namibia

References

External links
 Official Website of Development Bank of Namibia

Banks of Namibia
Banks established in 2004
Namibian companies established in 2004
Companies based in Windhoek
Development finance institutions